Hawkins is an American legal drama and murder mystery television series which aired for one season on CBS from 1973 and 1974. The series starred James Stewart as rural-bred lawyer Billy Jim Hawkins, who investigated the cases in which he was involved.

Premise

Billy Jim Hawkins had given up his position as a deputy district attorney and opened a small-town private law practice in the fictional town of Beauville, West Virginia. Despite the rural, small-town location of his law office, fancy clients from all over the United States come to him for a legal defense in murder cases. Hawkins has a pleasant, homespun manner and speaks slowly, but underneath this unassuming demeanor he is a shrewd and determined defense lawyer. He travels widely to investigate the cases he takes on, seeking evidence that will clear his clients and identify the real murderers. His cousin R. J. Hawkins travels with him and assists him in his investigations.

Cast
 James Stewart as Billy Jim Hawkins
 Strother Martin as R. J. Hawkins

Production
David Karp created Hawkins, and Arena Productions produced the series in association with MGM Television. The show bore similarities to James Stewart′s 1959 hit movie Anatomy of a Murder, in which he also played a small-town lawyer who investigated the cases in which he was involved.

Hawkins was Stewart′s second attempt at starring in a television series; he had made his debut in series television in the unsuccessful situation comedy The Jimmy Stewart Show, which aired on NBC for a single season from 1971 to 1972. Hawkins was a far better fit for Stewart′s acting talents; it received good critical reviews and Stewart won a 1973 Golden Globe Award for Best Actor in Television Drama Series for his portrayal of Billy Jim Hawkins. However, the series was cancelled after the production of only eight episodes (its pilot episode and one season of seven episodes). Stewart requested the cancellation because he believed that the quality of scripts and directors in television could not continuously measure up to the level to which he was accustomed with theatrical films. He did not return to series television.

Norman Felton was the show's executive producer and Karp wrote or co-wrote the pilot and the regular-season episodes. Jud Taylor directed the pilot and some of the regular-season episodes, and Paul Wendkos or Robert Scheerer directed the rest. Jerry Goldsmith wrote the theme music.

Broadcast history

The pilot episode of Hawkins aired as a 90-minute television movie on March 13, 1973. As a regular series, it premiered on October 2, 1973, airing on CBS on Tuesdays at 9:30 p.m. throughout its run. Like the series pilot, each regular-season episode was 90 minutes long. It was broadcast every third week as part of the "wheel series" The New CBS Tuesday Night Movies, alternating in its time slot with Shaft and a made-for-television movie. The "wheel series" was a popular programming strategy in television entertainment programming during the late 1960s and the 1970s in which two or more regular programs were rotated in the same time slot. However, Hawkins attracted a starkly different viewer demographic from Shaft, which probably worked against it finding an audience as part of The New CBS Tuesday Night Movies. With Hawkins suffering from low ratings and Stewart expressing his desire to bring the show to an end, its last new episode aired on March 5, 1974. Reruns of Hawkins ran in prime time during its regular time slot until September 3, 1974.

Episodes
SOURCES"Tuesday TV & Radio Schedule," Schenectady Gazette, December 4, 1973, p. 15."Tuesday TV & Radio Schedule," Schenectady Gazette, February 5, 1974, p. 11.

References

Citations

Bibliography
Brooks, Tim & Marsh, Earle (1995). The Complete Directory to Prime Time Network TV Shows: 1946-Present. Ballantine Books. .

McNeil, Alex (1996). Total Television. Penguin Books USA, Inc. .

External links
 
 Hawkins theme on YouTube
 Hawkins opening credits for Episode 1 "Murder in Movieland" on YouTube
 Hawkins opening and closing credits for episode "A Life for a Life" on YouTube
 Hawkins pilot Death and the Maiden on YouTube
 Hawkins Episode 1 "Murder in Movieland" on YouTube
 Hawkins Episode 2 "Die, Darling, Die" on YouTube
 Hawkins Episode 3 "A Life for a Life" on YouTube
 Hawkins Episode 4 "Blood Feud" on YouTube
 Hawkins Episode 5 "Murder in the Slave Trade" on YouTube
 Hawkins Episode 6 "Murder on the 13th Floor" on YouTube
 Hawkins Episode 7 "Candidate for Murder" on YouTube

CBS original programming
1970s American drama television series
1970s American legal television series
1973 American television series debuts
1974 American television series endings
English-language television shows
Television shows set in West Virginia
Television series by MGM Television